SprutCAM is a high-level Computer-Aided Manufacturing (CAM) software that provides off-line features for programming of various CNC machines used for cutting, wire electrical discharge (EDM), 2, 3, and multi axial (CNC Swiss-Type Lathe) machining.

The program was developed by SprutCAM Tech Ltd based in Limassol, Cyprus.

SprutCAM only supports Microsoft Windows 10/11 version.

History 
SPRUT Technology was founded in 1997 by Alexander Kharadziev, who recruited a team of engineers to build a company for developing CAx software. And released its own product, SprutCAM, in 1997. The company was relocated in 2021. The headquarters is now located in Limassol, Cyprus.

Version history 
Past Versions
 SprutCAM (1997)
 SprutCAM 2 (2000)
 SprutCAM 3 (August 4, 2003)
 SprutCAM 4 (May 6, 2005)
 SprutCAM 2007 (August 11, 2007)
 SprutCAM 7 (November 18, 2009)
 SprutCAM 8 (June 6, 2012)
 SprutCAM 9 (January 1, 2014)
 SprutCAM 10 (January 1, 2016)
 SprutCAM 11 (March 20, 2017)
 SprutCAM 11.5 (January 1, 2018)
 SprutCAM 12 (January 26, 2019)
 SprutCAM 14 (April 30, 2020)
 SprutCAM 15 (May, 2021)
Current Version:
 SprutCAM X 16 (May, 2022)

System requirements 
The system requirements for SprutCAM:

Computer aided design products
 SolidWorks
 T-FLEX
 IRONCAD
 AutoCAD
 Inventor
 SolidEdge
 Alibre Design
 Cobalt
 PowerShape
 Rhinoceros 3D
 SpaceClaim
 NX

SprutCAM works with associative CAD geometry and toolpaths; this allows modified geometry or machining parameters to quickly obtain updated toolpaths.

File format 
SprutCAM opens/saves following file formats:
 SprutCAM Files (*.stc, *.stcx)
 Operation/Parameters Files (*.sto)
 IGES: *.igs, *.iges
 STL: *.stl
 PostScript: *.ps, *.eps
 DXF: *.dxf
 Rhinoceros: *3dm
 Sprut Models: *.sgm
 Parasolid: *.x_t, *.x_b
 STEP: *.stp, *.step
 Sprut geometry format: *.sgf
 SOLIDWORKS: *.sldprt, *.sldasm
 SolidEdge: *.par, *.psm, *.pwd, *.asm
 PLY: *.ply
 AMF: *.amf
 Toolpath: *.xml, *.txt
 Template: *.html
 Postprocessors: *.sppx, *.spp, *.ppp, *.inp

Export/Convert following Formats via CAD Plugin as Background Process to IGES an Import:
 Rhinoceros: *.3dm
 Cobalt: *.co
 PowerShape: *.fic, *.model, *.psmodel, *.dgk, *.pfm, *.x_b, *.xmt_bin, *.x_t, *.xmt_txt, *.stp, *.step, *.prt, *.par, *.sldprt, *.vda
 Autodesk: *.iam, *.idw, *.ipt, *.ipn, *.ide, *.prt, *.asm, *.sat, *.ste, *.step, *.dwg, *.dxf, *.iges, *.igs
 Rhinoceros: *.3dm, *.rws, *.3ds, *.stp, *.step, *.raw, *.wrl, *.vrml, *.ai, *.eps, *.lwo, *.spl, *.vda, *.dwg, *.dxf, *.dgn, *.sldprt, *.sldasm
 SolidEdge: *.asm, *.dft, *.par, *.psm, *.mds, *.pwd, *.dgn, *.dxf, *.dwg, *.prt, *.sat, *.stp, *.step, *.x_b, *.xmt_bin, *.x_t, *.xmt_txt
 SOLIDWORKS: *.sldasm, *.asm, *.sldprt, *.prt, *.slddrw, *.drw, *.x_b, *.xmt_bin, *.x_t, *.xmt_txt, *.stp, *.step
 T-FLEX: *.grb

See also
CAx
CAM
CNC
Machining
Off-line robot programming

References

External links
 Official SprutCAM Website
 Official SprutCAM Robot Website

Computer-aided manufacturing software